Some Other Sucker's Parade is the fifth studio album by Del Amitri, released on 24 June 1997 by A&M Records. It reached number 6 in the UK Albums Chart.

History 

The album's recording was characterised by changes in personnel. Drummer Ashley Soan had joined the band soon after the release of Twisted (1995), and following their 1995 US tour the group parted company with guitarist David Cummings, who left to become a television scriptwriter. Jon McLoughlin was drafted in to replace him, and would co-write Some Other Sucker's Parades title track with singer/bassist Justin Currie. Both Soan and McLoughlin left soon after the album's recording.

Intended to communicate the band's live sound, the album deliberately used few studio effects in favour of a "raw" feel. "Absolutely as few overdubs as possible," confirmed guitarist Iain Harvie in an October 1997 interview with Guitarist magazine. "Probably about 80 per cent of the songs on this record don't have overdubs, apart from the vocals obviously, with all the harmonies, and maybe the guitar solo if there was a really dreadful mistake in the middle that we just couldn't live with. Wherever possible, we recorded with our live format of bass, drums, two guitars and keyboards for most of the songs."

"Medicine" was slated for a release as the album's second single in September 1997, but was canceled following the death of Princess Diana, due to the lyrics' fleeting mention of a "wreckage".

Track listing
All tracks are written by Justin Currie, except where noted.

"Not Where It's At" – 3:39
"Some Other Sucker's Parade" (Currie, Jon McLoughlin) – 3:08
"Won't Make It Better" (Currie, Iain Harvie) – 3:59
"What I Think She Sees" – 2:59
"Medicine" – 2:50
"High Times" (Currie, Harvie) – 4:26
"Mother Nature's Writing" (Currie, Harvie) – 3:50
"No Family Man" – 2:54
"Cruel Light of Day" – 3:13
"Funny Way To Win" (Currie, Harvie) – 3:36
"Through All That Nothing" (Currie, Harvie) – 3:55
"Life Is Full" – 3:22
"Lucky Guy" (Currie, Harvie) – 4:54
"Make It Always Be Too Late" – 3:22Australian and Japanese bonus tracks'
"Sleep Instead of Teardrops" – 4:31 (B-side of "Not Where It's At") 
"Paper Thin (Ambient Mix)" – 3:30 (B-side of "Don't Come Home Too Soon")

Personnel
Credits adapted from the album liner notes.

Del Amitri
Justin Currie – vocals, bass
Iain Harvie – guitar, bass on "Medicine" and "Life Is Full"
Jon McLoughlin – guitar
Andy Alston – keyboard
Ash Soan – drums, percussion
Additional musicians
The London Session Orchestra – strings on "Some Other Sucker's Parade" and "What I Think She Sees"
Jamie Seyberth – whistle on "Funny Way To Win"
Will Malone – string arrangements on "Some Other Sucker's Parade" and "What I Think She Sees", brass arrangement on "Make It Always Be Too Late"
Technical
Mark Freegard – producer, engineer
David Bianco – mixing (at Larrabee Sound Studios, Hollywood, Los Angeles)
Michael Nash Associates – design
Mario Sorrenti – photography

Charts

References

External links
Official Del Amitri homepage

Del Amitri albums
1997 albums
A&M Records albums